General elections were held in Saint Lucia on 23 May 1997. The result was a victory for the Saint Lucia Labour Party, which won sixteen of the seventeen seats. Voter turnout was 66.1%.

Results

References

Saint Lucia
Elections in Saint Lucia
General
Saint Lucia